Sterphus rufoabdominalis is a species of Hoverfly in the family Syrphidae.

Distribution
Costa Rica.

References

Eristalinae
Insects described in 1997
Diptera of South America